Next to No Time is a 1958 British comedy, filmed in colour, starring Kenneth More, Betsy Drake, John Laurie, Sid James and Irene Handl. It was written and directed by Henry Cornelius and was based on Paul Gallico's short story "The Enchanted Hour".

It was the last completed feature film from Cornelius, who died in 1958.

Plot 
A mild-mannered British planning engineer is sent across the Atlantic by his firm to negotiate a deal, a task for which he feels hugely out of his depth. However, a friendly barman, with the help of one of his special cocktails, convinces him that his personality changes during the hour when the clocks on the ship are stopped when it enters a new time zone in its progress west.

Cast

Production
In March 1957 Henry Cornelius travelled to the US to look for an American co-star to appear opposite Kenneth More.

Release
The film was premiered at the cinema on the Queen Elizabeth, where some of the film was shot, while the ship was docked at Southhampton. It was released in the US by Rank Distributors of America - the first time that company had distributed a non-Rank movie.

Critical reception 
Variety called it "a flimsy comedy" with "impeccable casting".

The New York Times wrote, "Mr. Cornelius' little frolic is very much like the bubbles cascading around the opening title and credits—thin, transparent and bouncy." Radio Times called it a "pleasant time-killer".

After Cornelius' death, a friend of his wrote how "intensely personal, of all this films", Next to No Time was to the writer-director, adding:
A man of acute introspection and self-examination, he identified himself closely with The Little Guy in the story... The character in the film, played by Kenneth More, is a planning engineer in a large factory who finds a difficulty in convincing his employers of his ability. “I know I’ve got it in me” the character says in effect, “but when it comes to putting myself over to people, 1 don’t know how to do it.” In the course of the story. The Little Guy learns how to do it, and becomes a Big Guy. Remembering his own early struggles to convince people of his ability, studying his own development as a man, ever grateful for the success which his ability and determination attained, Cornelius had a passionate belief that his new film, for all its trappings of comedy, would give help and encouragement to the millions of Little Guys who would be given an opportunity to see it. This perhaps serves best to illustrate his overall attitude towards film-making. From boyhood, he saw the medium as a means of disseminating ideas. And the idea that seemed most to excite him is that in our world,The Big Guy is only The Little Guy who has crossed the rubicon by his belief in himself. His death robs the British cinema of its most serious comedy maker.

References

External links 
 
 
Next to No Time at Letterbox DVD
Next to No Time at BFI
Next To No Time at Reel Streets

1958 films
1958 comedy films
Films directed by Henry Cornelius
Films based on short fiction
British comedy films
Films scored by Georges Auric
Films shot at Shepperton Studios
Films set in London
Seafaring films
1950s English-language films
1950s British films